Sawcolts is a small township in the southwest of the island of Antigua. It is located to the east of Sage Hill in the Shekerley Mountains, the low range which skirts the island's southeastern coastline. The township is located to the north of Fig Tree Drive, the scenic route which connects Swetes and the south coast at Old Road.

References
Scott, C. R. (ed.) (2005) Insight guide: Caribbean (5th edition). London: Apa Publications.

Populated places in Antigua and Barbuda
Saint Mary Parish, Antigua and Barbuda